Pedgaon may refer to:

 Pedgaon, Ahmednagar, a village in Ahmednagar district of Maharashtra state of India
 Pedgaon, Parbhani, a village and railway station in Parbhani district of Maharashtra state of India